Walter Louis Buenger (born January 19, 1951) is an historian of Texas and the American South and, since 2017, is a professor of history at the University of Texas in Austin, Texas.

Background
Buenger received all three of his degrees, Bachelor of Arts, Master of Arts, and Ph.D., from Rice University in Houston in 1973, 1977, and 1979, respectively. Immediately thereafter at the age of twenty-eight, he joined the history faculty at Texas A&M University. He became head of the History department in 2002 and remained there until 2017 when he accepted the position of Summerlee Foundation Chair in Texas History at the University of Texas at Austin. Simultaneously, he became the Chief Historian  at the Texas State Historical Association (TSHA).

Scholarly pursuits
Buenger's 2001 book The Path to a Modern South: Northeast Texas Between Reconstruction and the Great Depression was awarded the Coral H. Tullis Award, given annually to a book that focuses on Texas.  He is a fellow, past president (2009–2010) and current Chief Historian of the Texas State Historical Association.

Comments on Texas History Curriculum Controversy 
In September 2018, it was announced that a work group tasked with advising the State Board of Education on social studies curriculum revisions had proposed that educators refrain from calling defenders of The Alamo as "heroic" The recommendation drew the ire of Republican Governor Greg Abbott, a candidate for re-election in the November 6 general, who urged voters to express opposition to the proposal to their district member on the Texas Board of Education. The recommendation was among several hundred additions, deletions, and tweaks offered by the advisory the panel. The committee said "heroic" is "a value(s)-charged word." Buenger said that he could understand why the word 'heroic' is divisive: "Many times the Alamo gets boiled down, as it often does in movies, to the Mexicans are the bad guys and the good guys are good Anglos in coonskin caps." He noted that at least six Mexicans, calling themselves Texians, fought with the American defenders: "Part of the problem with the word heroic may be that it's too simplistic," Buenger added. After public hearings were conducted, the Board of Education voted to amend the Texas history curriculum to refer "to the heroism of the diverse defenders who gave their lives" at the Alamo.

Family

The Buengers, who reside in Austin, Texas, have a son, Carl Davis Buenger (born ca. 1988), who graduated from Rice University with a mathematics degree in 2010. Their daughter, Erin Channing Buenger, died in 2009 of neuroblastoma pediatric cancer at the age of eleven. Former U.S. Representative Chet Edwards, a Buenger family friend, sponsored a successful bill to earmark $150 million toward a cure for neuroblastoma and other cancers. The measure was signed into law by U.S. President George W. Bush in July 2008.

References

American non-fiction writers
Historians of the United States
1951 births
Living people
Rice University alumni
Texas A&M University faculty
People from Bryan, Texas
People from Fort Stockton, Texas
American Presbyterians
Texas Democrats
20th-century American historians
20th-century American male writers
21st-century American historians
21st-century American male writers
American male non-fiction writers
Historians from Texas
University of Texas faculty
Texas State Historical Association presidents